The 68th Cannes Film Festival was held from 13 to 24 May 2015. Joel and Ethan Coen were the Presidents of the Jury for the main competition. It was the first time that two people chaired the jury. Since the Coen brothers each received a separate vote, they were joined by seven other jurors to form the customary nine-juror panel. French actor Lambert Wilson was the host for the opening and closing ceremonies.

The Palme d'Or was awarded to the French film Dheepan directed by Jacques Audiard. On winning the award Audiard said "To receive a prize from the Coen brothers is something pretty exceptional. I'm very touched".

The festival poster featured Hollywood star and Swedish actress Ingrid Bergman, photographed by David Seymour. The poster was chosen to pay tribute to Bergman for her contributions to films and who also served as the Jury President at 1973 Cannes Film Festival. As part of the tribute to Bergman, the Swedish documentary Ingrid Bergman: In Her Own Words was screened in the Cannes Classics section.

Standing Tall, directed by Emmanuelle Bercot, was the festival's opening film. This was the second opening film in the festival's history to have been directed by a woman, after A Man in Love by Diane Kurys which opened the 1987 Cannes Film Festival. Ice and the Sky, directed by Luc Jacquet, was the festival's closing film. Both the opening and closing films were selected for the strength and importance of their messages—Standing Tall for the way its themes respond to the Charlie Hebdo shootings and Ice and the Sky for its concern for the future of the planet.

French film director Agnès Varda was presented with the honorary Palme d'Or at the festival's closing ceremony. She is also the first female filmmaker to ever receive the award.

The Official Selection of films for the 2015 festival, including the line-up for the Main Competition, was announced on 16 April 2015.

At the festival, director Thierry Frémaux asked celebrities to abstain from taking selfies on the red carpet. While he did not have the powers to ban the pictures from the red carpet altogether, Thierry Fremaux urged celebrities to resist the temptation.

Juries

Main competition
The full jury for the Main Competition was announced on 21 April 2015:
Joel and Ethan Coen, American film directors, Jury Presidents
Rossy de Palma, Spanish actress
Sophie Marceau, French actress and film director
Sienna Miller, English actress
Rokia Traoré, Malian singer-songwriter and composer
Guillermo del Toro, Mexican film director
Xavier Dolan, Canadian film director and actor
Jake Gyllenhaal, American actor

Un Certain Regard
Isabella Rossellini, Italian-American actress, President
Haifaa al-Mansour, Saudi Arabian film director
Nadine Labaki, Lebanese film director and actress
Panos H. Koutras, Greek film director
Tahar Rahim, French actor

Camera d'Or
Sabine Azéma, French actress, President
Delphine Gleize, French film director
Melvil Poupaud, French actor
Claude Garnier, French cinematographer
Didier Huck, French Technicolor executive
Yann Gonzalez, French film director
Bernard Payen, French film critic and curator

Cinéfondation and short films
Abderrahmane Sissako, Mauritanian film director, President
Joana Hadjithomas, Lebanese film director
Rebecca Zlotowski, French film director
Cécile de France, Belgian actress
Daniel Olbrychski, Polish actor

Independent juries

Nespresso Grand Prize (International Critics' Week)
Ronit Elkabetz, Israeli actress and film director, President
Katell Quillévéré, French film director
Peter Suschitzky, English cinematographer
Andréa Picard, Canadian film curator and critic
Boyd van Hoeij, France-based Dutch film critic

L'Œil d'or
Rithy Panh, Franco-Cambodian documentary film director, President  
Nicolas Philibert, French documentary film director
Irène Jacob, Franco-Swiss actress
Diana El Jeiroudi, Syrian documentary film producer
Scott Foundas, American film critic

Queer Palm
Desiree Akhavan, American-Iranian film director and actress, President
Ava Cahen, French journalist
Elli Mastorou, Belgian film journalist
Nadia Turincev, French film producer
Laëtitia Eïdo, French actress

Official selection

In competition
The films competing for the Palme d'Or were announced at a press conference on 16 April 2015. Two films were added to the main competition line-up on 23 April 2015, Valley of Love, directed by Guillaume Nicloux, and Chronic, directed by Michel Franco. The Palme d'Or winner has been highlighted.

(CdO) indicates film eligible for the Caméra d'Or as directorial debut feature. - (QP) film eligible for the Queer Palm.

Un Certain Regard
The following films competed in the Un Certain Regard section. Lamb, the first feature film directed by Yared Zeleke, is also the first Ethiopian film to be included in the Official Selection. Sweet Red Bean Paste, directed by Naomi Kawase, was announced as the opening film for the Un Certain Regard section.  The Un Certain Regard Prize winner has been highlighted.

(CdO) film eligible for the Caméra d'Or as directorial debut feature. - (ŒdO) film eligible for the Œil d'or as documentary.

Out of competition
The following films were selected to screen out of competition:

(CdO) indicates film eligible for the Caméra d'Or as directorial debut feature. - (ŒdO) film eligible for the Œil d'or as documentary. - (QP) film eligible for the Queer Palm.

Special screenings

(CdO) indicates film eligible for the Caméra d'Or as directorial debut feature. - (ŒdO) film eligible for the Œil d'or as documentary.

Cinéfondation
The Cinéfondation section focuses on films made by students at film schools. The following 18 entries (14 fiction films and 4 animation films) were selected out of 1,600 submissions. More than one-third of the films selected represent schools participating in Cinéfondation for the first time. It is also the first time that a film representing a Spanish film school had been selected. The winner of the Cinéfondation First Prize has been highlighted.

Short films
Out of 4,550 entries, the following films were selected to compete for the Short Film Palme d'Or. The Short film Palme d'Or winner has been highlighted.

Cannes Classics
The full line-up for the Cannes Classics section was announced on 30 April 2015. Greek-French film director Costa-Gavras was announced as the guest of honor. In tribute to the recently deceased Portuguese film director, Cannes Classics screened Manoel de Oliveira's posthumous 1982 film Memories and Confessions. The film was previously unseen outside of Portugal.

(CdO) indicates film eligible for the Caméra d'Or as directorial debut feature. - (ŒdO) film eligible for the Œil d'or as documentary.
* screening possibly cancelled.

Cinéma de la Plage
The Cinéma de la Plage is a part of the Official Selection of the festival. The outdoors screenings at the beach cinema of Cannes are open to the public.

Parallel sections

International Critics' Week
The full selection for the International Critics' Week section was announced on 20 April 2015, at the section's website. The Anarchists, directed by Elie Wajeman, and Learn by Heart, directed by Mathieu Vadepied, were selected as the opening and closing films for the International Critics' Week section.

Feature films - The winner of the Nespresso Grand Prize has been highlighted.

(CdO) indicates film eligible for the Caméra d'Or as directorial debut feature. - (QP) film eligible for the Queer Palm.

Shorts selection - The winner of the Discovery Award for Short Film has been highlighted.

Special screenings

(CdO) indicates film eligible for the Caméra d'Or as directorial debut feature. - (QP) film eligible for the Queer Palm.

Directors' Fortnight
The full selection for the Directors' Fortnight section was announced on 21 April 2015, at the section's website. In the Shadow of Women, directed by Philippe Garrel, and Dope, directed by Rick Famuyiwa were selected as the opening and closing films for the Directors' Fortnight section. Actua 1, a previously unseen 1968 short film directed by Garrel, preceded the screening of In the Shadow of Women.

Feature films - The winner of the Art Cinema Award has been highlighted.

(CdO) indicates film eligible for the Caméra d'Or as directorial debut feature. - (ŒdO) film eligible for the Œil d'or as documentary. - (QP) film eligible for the Queer Palm.

Shorts selection - The winner of the Illy Prize for Short Film has been highlighted.

Special screenings

ACID
ACID, an association of French and foreign film directors, demonstrates its support for nine films each year, seeking to provide support from filmmakers to other filmmakers. The full ACID selection was announced on 21 April 2015, at the section's website.

(QP) indicates film eligible for the Queer Palm.

Awards

Official awards
In Competition
 Palme d'Or: Dheepan by Jacques Audiard
 Grand Prix: Son of Saul by László Nemes
 Best Director: Hou Hsiao-hsien for The Assassin
 Best Screenplay: Michel Franco for Chronic
 Best Actress:
 Emmanuelle Bercot for Mon roi
 Rooney Mara for Carol
 Best Actor: Vincent Lindon for The Measure of a Man
 Jury Prize: The Lobster by Yorgos Lanthimos
 Special Award - Honorary Palme d'Or: Agnès Varda

Un Certain Regard
 Prix Un Certain Regard: Rams by Grímur Hákonarson
 Un Certain Regard Jury Prize: The High Sun by Dalibor Matanić
 Un Certain Regard Award for Best Director: Kiyoshi Kurosawa for Journey to the Shore
 Prix Un Certain Talent: The Treasure by Corneliu Porumboiu
 Un Certain Regard Special Prize for Promising Future:
 Nahid by Ida Panahandeh
 Masaan by Neeraj Ghaywan

Golden Camera
 Caméra d'Or: Land and Shade by César Augusto Acevedo

Cinéfondation
 First Prize: Share by Pippa Bianco
 Second Prize: Lost Queens by Ignacio Juricic Merillán
 Third Prize: The Return of Erkin by Maria Guskova and Victor XX by Ian Garrido López

Short Films
 Short Film Palme d'Or: Waves '98 by Ely Dagher
 Short Film Palme d'Or: 
P.S. I Can’t Breathe by Monet Merchand and Rochelle Leanne

Independent awards

FIPRESCI Prizes
 Son of Saul by László Nemes (In Competition)
 Masaan by Neeraj Ghaywan (Un Certain Regard)
 Paulina by Santiago Mitre (International Critics' Week)

Vulcan Award of the Technical Artist
 Vulcan Award: Tamás Zányi (sound designer) for Son of Saul

Ecumenical Jury
 Prize of the Ecumenical Jury: Mia Madre by Nanni Moretti
 Commendations:
 The Measure of a Man by Stéphane Brizé
 Trap by Brillante Mendoza

Awards in the frame of International Critics' Week
 Nespresso Grand Prize: Paulina by Santiago Mitre
 France 4 Visionary Award: Land and Shade by César Augusto Acevedo
 SACD Award: Land and Shade by César Augusto Acevedo
 Sony CineAlta Discovery Award for Short Film: Chickenpox by Fulvio Risuleo
 Canal+ Award: Ramona by Andrei Crețulescu
 Gan Foundation Support for Distribution Award: The Wakhan Front by Clément Cogitore

Awards in the frame of Directors' Fortnight
 Art Cinema Award: Embrace of the Serpent by Ciro Guerra
 SACD Prize: My Golden Days by Arnaud Desplechin
 Europa Cinemas Label Award: Mustang by Deniz Gamze Ergüven
 Illy Prize for Short Film: Rate Me by Fyzal Boulifa
 Special Mention: The Exquisite Corpus by Peter Tscherkassky

L'Œil d'or Jury
 L'Œil d'or: Beyond My Grandfather Allende by Marcia Tambutti Allende
 Special Mention: Ingrid Bergman: In Her Own Words by Stig Björkman

Queer Palm Jury
 Queer Palm Award: Carol by Todd Haynes
 Special Mention: The Lobster by Yorgos Lanthimos
 Short Film Queer Palm: Lost Queens by Ignacio Juricic Merillán

Palm Dog Jury
 Palm Dog Award: Lucky the Maltipoo for Arabian Nights
 Grand Jury Prize: "Bob" from The Lobster
 Palm Dog Manitarian award: I Am a Soldier

Prix François Chalais
 François Chalais Prize: Son of Saul by László Nemes

Cannes Soundtrack Award
 Lim Giong for The Assassin

References

External links

2015 Cannes Film Festival (web.archive)
Official website Retrospective 2015 
68ème Festival de Cannes
Cannes Film Festival: Awards for 2015 at Internet Movie Database

2015
2015 film festivals
2015 festivals in Europe
2015 in French cinema